Sitashma Chand (born 31 October 1983) is a Nepalese professional model and beauty queen who won Miss Nepal in 2007. She was crowned as Miss Nepal 2007 in Kathmandu on April 7, 2007. She represented Nepal in Miss World 2007.

Personal life
Sitashma Chand was born in Kathmandu on 31 October 1983. She studied at St. Mary School in Kathmandu where she used to be a captain of her college’s girls basketball team. She later joined Rato Bangla women’s club. It was under her captainship that the team won two national championships in the years 2004 and 2005. She had a long-term boyfriend with whom she broke up with after moving to UAE. Sitashma married Benjamin Zachary Price in February 2013. She is multilingual including her mother tongue Chandi. She fluently speaks Nepali, English, Hindi and French.

References

External links

See also

Nepalese female models
1983 births
Living people
People from Kathmandu
Miss Nepal winners
Miss World 2007 delegates